

Appointed governors
Morihide Nomura 1871-1873
Tasuke Shirane 1873-1882
Kiyohide Yoshida 1882-1889
Eitaro Komatsubara 1889-1891
Kanichi Kubota 1891-1892
Tsunao Hayashi 1892-1894
Tomi Senketaka 1894-1897
Tadashi Munakata 1897–1898
Ogimachi Sanemasa 1899–1900
Yamada Shunzō 1900–1902
Shuichi Kinoshita 1902–1905
Marquis Okubo Toshi Takeshi 1905–1907
Shimada Gotaro 1907–1913
Soeda Keiichiro 1913–1914
Akira Masaya 1914–1916
Tadahiko Okada 1916–1919
Horiuchi Hidetaro 1919–1923
Motoda Tashio 1923–1924
Saito Morikuni 1924–1927
Yashu 1927
Miyawaki Umekichi (1st time) 1927–1929
Shirane Takekai 1929
Hosokawa Chohei 1929–1930
Niwa Shichiro 1930–1931
Kozo Yamanaka 1931
Miyawaki Umekichi (2nd time) 1931–1932
Shigezo Fukushima 1932–1933
Hirose Hisatada 1933–1934
Ichisho Inuma 1934–1935
Saito Juri 1935–1936
Jitsuzo Kawanishi 1936–1938
Toki Ginjiro 1938–1941
Miyano Shozo 1941–1942
Toshio Otsu 1942–1943
Sudo Tetsushin 1943-1944
Ryuichi Fukumoto 1944-1945
Sekigaiyo Otoko 1945-1946
Jitzuzo Nishimura (1st time) 1946-1947

Elected governors
Hitoshi Miyawaki 1947
Jitzuzo Nishimura (2nd time) 1947-1949
Yoshida Tadakazu 1949 (acting)
Yuuichi Oosawa 1949-1956
Hiroshi Kurihara 1956-1972
Yawara Hata 1972–1992
Yoshihiko Tsuchiya 1992-2003
Nobuyuki Aoki (acting) 2003
Kiyoshi Ueda 2003–2019
Motohiro Ōno 2019-present

External links 
 List of Japanese prefectural governors

 
Saitama Prefecture